Palata or Polota is a river in Belarus and Russia, a tributary of the Western Dvina river. Rising in Pskov Oblast of Russia and flowing through northern Belarus, it merges with the Western Dvina at Polatsk. Palata receives its name from Lithuanian Puolauta,  meaning 'falling into', i.e., the river which flows into a bigger river.

Rivers of Vitebsk Region
Rivers of Pskov Oblast
International rivers of Europe
Rivers of Belarus